Rugoloa is a genus of flowering plants belonging to the family Poaceae.

Its native range stretches from Mexico, down to southern tropical America, and is found in north-eastern Argentina, Belize, Bolivia, Brazil, Colombia, Costa Rica, Cuba, Dominican Republic, Ecuador, El Salvador, French Guiana, Guatemala, Guyana, Haiti, Honduras, Jamaica, Leeward Islands, Mexico, Nicaragua, Panamá, Paraguay, Peru, Suriname, Trinidad and Tobago, Uruguay, Venezuela and Windward Islands.

The genus was circumscribed by Fernando Omar Zuloaga in Pl. Syst. Evol. vol.300 (10) on page 2164 in 2014.

The genus name of Rugoloa is in honour of Sulma (Zulma) E. Rúgolo de Agrasar (b.1940), who was an Argentinian botanist (specialist in grasses) and Curator and Professor at the National University of La Pampa.

Species
As accepted by Plants of the World Online;
Rugoloa hylaeica 
Rugoloa pilosa 
Rugoloa polygonata

References

Poaceae
Poaceae genera
Flora of Mexico
Flora of Central America
Flora of the Caribbean
Flora of northern South America
Flora of western South America
Flora of Brazil
Flora of Northeast Argentina